Steven Brem is an American neurosurgeon at the Perelman School of Medicine at the University of Pennsylvania. He graduated from Harvard School of Medicine and completed his residency at Massachusetts General Hospital.

Glioma Surgery

Brem authored the comprehensive glioblastoma textbook "Glioblastoma".

References 

American neurosurgeons
Harvard Medical School alumni
Perelman School of Medicine at the University of Pennsylvania faculty
Massachusetts General Hospital residents
Year of birth missing (living people)
Living people